The BB postcode area, also known as the Blackburn postcode area, is a group of thirteen postcode districts in north-west England, within nine post towns. These cover east Lancashire, including Blackburn, Burnley, Accrington, Barnoldswick, Clitheroe, Colne, Darwen, Nelson and Rossendale.



Coverage
The approximate coverage of the postcode districts:

|-
! style="background:#FFFFFF;"|BB0
| style="background:#FFFFFF;"|BLACKBURN
| style="background:#FFFFFF;"|Granby Marketing, Blackburn
| style="background:#FFFFFF;"|non-geographic
|-
! BB1
| BLACKBURN
| Blackburn (east), Bank Hey, Belthorn (part), Blackamoor, Clayton-le-Dale, Guide, Knuzden, Mellor, Ramsgreave, Rishton, Salesbury, Shadsworth, Sunnybower, Tottleworth, Whitebirk, Wilpshire
| Blackburn with Darwen, Hyndburn, Ribble Valley
|-
! BB2
| BLACKBURN
| Blackburn (west), Beardwood, Balderstone, Belthorn (part), Cherry Tree, Feniscowles, Griffin, Holly Tree, Livesey, Mellor, Mellor Brook, Mill Hill, Osbaldeston, Pleasington, Witton
| Blackburn with Darwen, Chorley, Ribble Valley, South Ribble
|-
! BB3
| DARWEN
| Darwen, Bank Fold, Eccleshill, Hoddlesden, Livesey, Lower Darwen, Pickup Bank, Tockholes
| Blackburn with Darwen
|-
! BB4
| ROSSENDALE
| Acre, Balladen, Bent Gate, Cloughfold, Cowpe, Crawshawbooth, Haslingden, Helmshore, Lumb (near Rawtenstall), Newchurch, Rawtenstall, Waterfoot, Weir
| Rossendale
|-
! BB5
| ACCRINGTON
| Accrington, Altham, Baxenden, Church, Clayton-le-Moors, Huncoat, Oswaldtwistle, Rising Bridge
| Hyndburn, Rossendale
|-
! BB6
| BLACKBURN
| Dinckley, Great Harwood, Langho
| Hyndburn, Ribble Valley
|-
! BB7
| CLITHEROE
| Clitheroe, Barrow, Bashall Eaves, Billington, Bolton-by-Bowland, Chatburn, Downham, Dunsop Bridge, Gisburn, Great Mitton, Grindleton, Hurst Green, Little Mitton, Middop, Newsholme, Newton-in-Bowland, Paythorne, Pendleton, Rimington, Sabden, Sawley, Slaidburn, Twiston, Waddington, Whalley, Whitewell, Wiswell, Worston
| Ribble Valley
|-
! BB8
| COLNE
| Colne, Foulridge, Laneshaw Bridge, Trawden, Winewall, Wycoller
| Pendle
|-
! BB9
| NELSON
| Nelson, Barrowford, Blacko, Brierfield, Higherford, Roughlee
| Pendle
|-
! BB10
| BURNLEY
| Burnley (east), Cliviger, Haggate, Harle Syke, Reedley, Worsthorne
| Burnley, Pendle
|-
! BB11
| BURNLEY
| Burnley (south and town centre), Dunnockshaw and Clowbridge, Hapton
| Burnley
|-
! BB12
| BURNLEY
| Burnley (west), Barley, Fence, Hapton, Higham, Padiham, Read, Simonstone, Wheatley Lane
| Burnley, Pendle, Ribble Valley
|-
! BB18
| BARNOLDSWICK
| Barnoldswick, Bracewell and Brogden, Earby, Kelbrook, Salterforth, Sough
| Pendle
|-
! style="background:#FFFFFF;"|BB94
| style="background:#FFFFFF;"|BARNOLDSWICK
| style="background:#FFFFFF;"|Holiday Cottages Group, Earby
| style="background:#FFFFFF;"|non-geographic
|}

The BB18 district was formed out of the BB8 district in 1997.

Map

See also
List of postcode areas in the United Kingdom
Centre points of the United Kingdom
Postcode Address File

References

External links
Royal Mail's Postcode Address File
A quick introduction to Royal Mail's Postcode Address File (PAF)

Blackburn with Darwen
Postcode areas covering North West England
Lancashire-related lists